The Death of Me is the second studio album by Australian metalcore band Polaris. The band produced and recorded in Mollybook Beach NSW with Lance Prenc and Scottie Simpson engineering, and it was mixed by Carson Slovak and Grant McFarland of Atrium Audio at Think Loud Studios, PA, USA. The album was released on 21 February 2020 under Resist Records and SharpTone Records and has been nominated for an ARIA Award for Best Hard Rock or Heavy Metal Album. The album was nominated for Best Album at the 2021 Rolling Stone Australia Awards.

At the AIR Awards of 2021, the album won Best Independent Heavy Album or EP.

Chart performance
The album debuted at number 3 on the Australian ARIA charts and at number 39 in Germany.

Tour
On 14 November 2019, the band announced a tour for February 2020 in support of the album, which featured the bands Wage War, Crystal Lake and Alpha Wolf.

Track listing

Personnel
Polaris
 Daniel Furnari – drums
 Jamie Hails – unclean vocals, clean vocals tracks 3 & 8
 Rick Schneider – rhythm guitar 
 Jake Steinhauser – bass, clean vocals 
 Ryan Siew – lead guitar

Charts

Awards

AIR Awards
The Australian Independent Record Awards (known colloquially as the AIR Awards) is an annual awards night to recognise, promote and celebrate the success of Australia's Independent Music sector.

! 
|-
| 2021
| The Death of Me
| Best Independent Heavy Album or EP
| 
| 
|}

ARIA Music Awards
The ARIA Music Awards is an annual awards ceremony that recognises excellence, innovation, and achievement across all genres of Australian music. 

|-
| 2020
| The Death of Me
| Best Hard Rock/Heavy Metal Album
| 
|-

Rolling Stone Australia Awards

|-
| Rolling Stone Australia Awards 2021
| The Death of Me
| Best Record
|

Release history

References

2020 albums
Polaris (Australian band) albums
Resist Records albums